Clubul Sportiv Brănești is a Romanian amateur football club based in Brăneşti, Ilfov County, Romania, founded in 1968, dissolved in 2012 and refounded in 2019. At its best, the team played in the Liga I, top-flight league in the Romanian football league system.

History

The football team was founded in 1968 by football-loving people from the Brăneşti commune and played its entire history in the lower leagues of the Romanian football system.

The ascension of the club practically began in 2007, after the club bought the place of Transkurier Sfântu Gheorghe in Liga III.

In a first season in which Victoria's objective was to avoid relegation, the team succeeded by finishing eighth. After that came the 2008–09 season, where at the end the team was promoted to the Liga II.

The club exceeded expectations by finishing first in the series, and it was promoted for the first time in its history to the Liga I. The club had therefore succeeded, in only four years, in ascending from the Liga IV to the Liga I. It was the first Romanian club that achieved this performance. In 2013 Corona Brașov managed to achieve the same performance.

Brăneşti also became the smallest locality to have ever played in the Liga I, with only 8,531 inhabitants, beating the previous record which belonged to Scorniceşti.

The team was relegated after only one season in Liga I. They started the 2011–12 season in the Liga II, but after 15 rounds the team was second to last. In February 2012, the team was disaffiliated by the Federation due to financial problems.

After the dissolvation, Brănești continued to play as Vulturii Pasărea until 2019. In 2019 the club was officially refounded as CS Brănești.

Stadium
CS Brănești played its home matches on the Cătălin Hîldan Stadium, which has a capacity of 2,500 seats.

The Liga I matches were played on the Municipal Stadium in Buzău and the Concordia Stadium in Chiajna, because theirs did not meet the requirements for the first division.

Honours

Liga II:
Winners (1): 2009–10

Liga III:
Winners (1): 2008–09

Liga IV – Ilfov County
Runners-up (1): 2021–22

Cupa României – Ilfov County
Winners (2): 2018–19, 2020–21

References

External links
 Club's page at romaniansoccer.ro

Sport in Ilfov County
Football clubs in Ilfov County
Association football clubs established in 1968
Liga I clubs
Liga II clubs
Liga III clubs
Liga IV clubs
1968 establishments in Romania